Bis-gamma-glutamylcystine reductase is an enzyme that catalyzes the chemical reaction

2 gamma-glutamylcysteine + NADP+  bis-gamma-glutamylcystine + NADPH + H+

Thus, the two substrates of this enzyme are gamma-glutamylcysteine and nicotinamide adenine dinucleotide phosphate ion, whereas its 3 products are bis-gamma-glutamylcystine, nicotinamide adenine dinucleotide phosphate, and hydrogen ion.

This enzyme belongs to the family of oxidoreductases, specifically those acting on a sulfur group of donors with NAD+ or NADP+ as acceptor.  The systematic name of this enzyme class is gamma-glutamylcysteine:NADP+ oxidoreductase. This enzyme is also called NADPH2:bis-gamma-glutamylcysteine oxidoreductase.  This enzyme participates in glutathione metabolism.

References

 
 

EC 1.8.1
NADPH-dependent enzymes
Enzymes of unknown structure